New Wine is a not-for-profit Christian evangelical organization based in the United Kingdom, that assists Christian churches with organizational leadership training and fundraising. The organization also holds its own annual summer conferences, which first took place in Somerset in 1989.

History
New Wine was set up by the former Bishop of the then-diocese of Chile, Bolivia and Peru, David Pytches, in 1989. Pytches was heavily influenced by the founder of the Vineyard Church, John Wimber, who had held a number of conferences through the 1980s, leading to increased interest in the charismatic movement in the United Kingdom.

Summer conferences
The first New Wine Christian Conference was held in 1989 at the Royal Bath and West Showground, Somerset and attracted nearly 2,500 people. The event now attracts more than 14,000 people per year, and since 2019 has been held at the East of England Showground in Peterborough.

In 1993 a separate conference, called Soul Survivor, aimed at teenagers and young adults was established by the evangelist Mike Pilavachi. This ran until 2019.

The conference has attracted a number of speakers prominent within the evangelical movement in the United Kingdom and the United States, including Baroness Caroline Cox, Jackie Pullinger, J.John, Heidi Baker, Bill Johnson, Francis Chan, Ken Costa and Brother Yun.

References

External links
 New Wine

Christian conferences
Christianity in England
Christian organizations established in 1989